The Legislative Assembly of the Yamalo-Nenets Autonomous Okrug is the regional parliament of the Yamalo-Nenets Autonomous Okrug, a federal subject of Russia. A total of 22 deputies are elected for five-year terms.

Elections

2020

References

Yamalo-Nenets Autonomous Okrug
Politics of Yamalo-Nenets Autonomous Okrug